Butorides is a genus of  small herons. It contains three similar species, the green heron or green-backed heron, Butorides virescens, the lava heron (Butorides sundevalli), and the striated heron, Butorides striatus. A fossil species, Butorides validipes, is known from the Early Pleistocene of Florida in the United States. Butorides is from Middle English Butor "bittern" and Ancient Greek -oides, "resembling".

Juveniles are browner above and streaked below, and have greenish-yellow legs.

The species have different underpart colours, chestnut with a white line down the front in green heron, and white or grey in striated. Both breed in small wetlands on a platform of sticks often in shrubs or trees, sometimes on the ground. The female lays three to five eggs. Both parents incubate for about 20 days until hatching, and feed the young birds which take a further three weeks to fledge.

Butorides herons stand still at the water's edge and wait to ambush prey. They mainly eat small fish, frogs and aquatic insects. They sometimes drop food on the water's surface to attract fish.

Taxonomy and range

The Butorides herons were formerly considered one species, but are now normally split as above, with the green heron breeding in eastern North America, Central America, the West Indies and the Pacific coast of Canada and the United States, and striated heron in the Old World tropics from west Africa to Japan, and in South America.

Birds in central Panama with buff necks have been considered to be hybrids between the two species, but the occurrence of similar birds beyond the range of migratory green herons means that there is still doubt about the species' limits of the Butorides herons.

References

 A guide to the birds of Costa Rica (1989), by F. Gary Stiles and Alexander Frank Skutch 

 
Bird genera
Herons
Extant Pleistocene first appearances
Taxa named by Edward Blyth